is a railway station located in the town of Ajigasawa, Aomori Prefecture, Japan, operated by the East Japan Railway Company (JR East).

Lines
Ajigasawa Station is served by the Gonō Line.

Station layout
Ajigasawa Station has dual opposed side platforms connected by a footbridge. The station has a Midori no Madoguchi staffed ticket office.

Platforms

Bus services 
Kōnan bus
For Fukaura via Kita-Kanegasawa and Ōdose
For Hirosaki Station via Tokoshinai
For Goshogawara Bus office via Morita, Kizukuri and Goshogawara Station
For Kuromori

History
Ajigasawa Station was opened on May 15, 1925, as a station on the Japanese Government Railways (JGR). With the privatization of the Japanese National Railways (successor of JGR) on April 1, 1987, it came under the operational control of JR East. A new station building was completed in 1991. From April 1, 2003, it has been a kan'i itaku station, administered by Goshogawara Station, and operated by Ajigasawa municipal authority, with point-of-sales terminal installed.

Passenger statistics
In fiscal 2016, the station was used by an average of 317 passengers daily (boarding passengers only).

Surrounding area 
Maito Post Office

See also 
List of Railway Stations in Japan

References

External links

  

Stations of East Japan Railway Company
Railway stations in Aomori Prefecture
Gonō Line
Ajigasawa, Aomori
Railway stations in Japan opened in 1925